This is the list of the railway stations in Lazio owned by:
 Rete Ferroviaria Italiana, a branch of the Italian state company Ferrovie dello Stato;
 ATAC SpA.

RFI stations

ATAC stations

See also

Railway stations in Italy
Ferrovie dello Stato
Rail transport in Italy
High-speed rail in Italy
Transport in Italy

References

External links

 
Lazio